The list of commanders in the Middle Eastern theatre of World War I gives the engagements and the respected officers during the conflicts.

Central Powers

Commander-in-chiefs:
 Ottoman Empire: Deputy commander-in-chief (Başkomutan Vekili) Enver Pasha (1914–1918)

Commanders:

Allies

Commander-in-chiefs:

 Russia (Caucasus & Persia): Illarion Ivanovich Vorontsov-Dashkov (1914 – January 1915); Nicholas Nikolaevich (January 1915 – May 1917); Vasily Kharlamov (May 1917 – 1918)
 British:
 Armenia: Tovmas Nazarbekian (1918)

Commanders:

References

 
Ottoman Empire in World War I
Middle Eastern
Military campaigns and theatres of World War I involving Australia